Sir George Forster, 2nd Baronet (21 March 1796 – 4 April 1876), was an Irish politician.

He was born at Baronstown Glebe, co. Louth, the only son and heir of Sir Thomas Forster, 1st Baronet of Coolderry, co. Monaghan and educated at Trinity College, Dublin, graduating B.A. in 1817 and M.A. in 1833. He succeeded to the baronetcy on the death of his father in 1843.

In 1817 Forster was appointed High Sheriff of Monaghan and then elected to the United Kingdom House of Commons as Member of Parliament for Monaghan in 1852, holding the seat until 1865.

He married twice: firstly in 1817, Anna Maria, daughter of Matthew Fortescue and secondly, in 1855, his cousin, Charlotte Jane, daughter of William Hoare Hume.

He died in Dublin aged 80 and was buried at Ballinode. He was succeeded by his eldest son, who became Sir Thomas Oriel Forster, 3rd Baronet.

References

External links 
 

    
    
    

1796 births
1876 deaths
Politicians from County Louth
Baronets in the Baronetage of Ireland
Members of the Parliament of the United Kingdom for County Monaghan constituencies (1801–1922)
UK MPs 1852–1857
UK MPs 1857–1859
UK MPs 1859–1865
High Sheriffs of Monaghan